Annie C. Maguire was a British three-masted barque sailing from Buenos Aires, Argentina, on 24 December 1886, when she struck the ledge at Portland Head Light, Cape Elizabeth, Maine. Lighthouse Keeper Joshua Strout, his son, wife, and volunteers rigged an ordinary ladder as a gangplank between the shore and the ledge against which the ship was heeled. Captain O'Neil, the ship's master, his wife, two mates, and the nine-man crew clambered onto the ledge and then, one by one, crossed the ladder to safety.

The cause of the wreck is puzzling, since visibility was not a problem. Members of the crew reported they "plainly saw Portland Light before the disaster and are unable to account for same."

Today, letters painted on the rocks below the lighthouse commemorate the wreck and the Christmas Eve rescue.

Gallery

References

External links
 
 
 
 
 

1853 ships
Maritime incidents in December 1886
Shipwrecks of the Maine coast